Konoksa is a rural locality (a village) in Kholmogorsky District, Arkhangelsk Oblast, Russia. The population was 7 as of 2010.

Geography 
Konoksa is located on the Severnaya Dvina River, 122 km south of Kholmogory (the district's administrative centre) by road. Zakonoksa is the nearest rural locality.

References 

Rural localities in Kholmogorsky District